Gladys Mills (29 August 1918 – 24 February 1978), known as Mrs Mills, was an English pianist who was active in the 1960s and 1970s, and who released many records. Her repertoire included many sing-along and party tunes made popular in the music hall, using a stride piano technique.

Early life
Mills was born in the East London suburb Beckton. Her uncle Henry was a harpist and her mother was the main influence in developing her musical ability. She took piano lessons from the age of 3½ to the age of seven.

She married Bert Mills in 1947;  they settled in Loughton, Essex, where she lived for most of her life.

Career

1960s
While working as the superintendent of a typing pool in the office of the Paymaster General in London, Mills performed as a honky-tonk pianist in the evenings and weekends. She was spotted by a talent scout while playing piano with a semi-professional band called The Astorians, at a dance at the Woodford Golf Club in Essex.

In 1961 she released her first record, "Mrs Mills Medley", a single that entered the Top Twenty of the UK Singles Chart.

At the age of 43, in December 1961, she made her first television appearance on The Billy Cotton Show. By the end of January 1962, she would be a household name, rising to fame during the same period as her stable-mates The Beatles, with whom she had shared space at Abbey Road Studios (as mentioned in the Beatles Anthology DVD bonus materials).

She toured the UK, making many appearances on TV and radio throughout the 1960s.  Mills was also a successful recording artist overseas in territories where there were large numbers of economic migrants from the UK, including Australia, Canada and Hong Kong. Her career as an entertainer was to last well into the 1970s.

She was signed to a management contract by Eric Easton, who later went on to manage The Dave Clark Five and The Rolling Stones, and then signed a recording contract with Parlophone.

Her oeuvre consisted of British and international standards, plus cover versions of contemporary hits. Her covers included "Diamonds Are a Girl's Best Friend", "Hello, Dolly!", "I'm Forever Blowing Bubbles" and "Yellow Submarine", all of which were re-released by EMI in their 2003 compilation The Very Best of Mrs Mills.

1970s
Mills appeared on two episodes of The Morecambe and Wise Show in 1971 and 1974, where she performed a medley of favourites with the studio orchestra. In 1973, she appeared in an episode of The Wheeltappers and Shunters Social Club.

In December 1974, she appeared as the subject of This Is Your Life, hosted by Eamonn Andrews, when it was revealed that the first record she had recorded was "A Gal in Calico", cut in a make-your-own-record booth on Southend Pier for a half-crown, with her girlhood pal Lily Dormer.

In 1975, her distinctive style of performance was satirised in an edition of BBC TV's The Two Ronnies, originally broadcast on BBC Two on 23 January 1975. The sketch, titled "Family Entertainment – John & Mrs Mills", occupied the end-of-the-show musical slot in episode 4 of the fourth series. It featured Ronnie Barker as a silk-laden Mrs Mills at piano and Ronnie Corbett as a uniformed Sir John Mills (who was no relation to Mrs Mills). Barker and Corbett performed a medley of Mills-style classics revolving around John Mills' character in the 1969 film Oh! What a Lovely War.

Little was seen of Mills on television in her final years, and she died of a heart attack on 24 February 1978 in London.

Legacy

The name "Mrs Mills" was given to a vintage 1905 Steinway Vertegrand upright piano, frequently used by her at Abbey Road Studios in London, where she recorded. The piano, with a characteristic out-of-tune honky-tonk sound, has remained in use at Abbey Road for over 50 years and was used in countless recordings made there, including some by The Beatles. According to Eddie Vedder in an interview for the SmartLess podcast in February 2022, Paul McCartney tried to buy the piano but the studio refused.

Although Mills' musical legacy had been largely forgotten in recent times, June 2012 saw the emergence of London-based tribute band The Mrs Mills Experience with a debut at The Vintage Festival at Boughton House in Northamptonshire. On 13 July, they were filmed playing live at The Prince Albert pub in Brixton, London Borough of Lambeth by the BBC. On 23 September 2012, BBC Four broadcast the 60-minute documentary Let's Have a Party! The Piano Genius of Mrs Mills on the life of Mills, which included footage of the band and contributions from Rick Wakeman, Rowland Rivron and Pete Murray, amongst others.

Eddie Vedder's 2022 album, Earthling, contains a song called "Mrs. Mills" about the piano, featuring Ringo Starr on drums.

Loughton Town Council commissioned a blue plaque to her memory on the house at 43 Barncroft Close, her home for many years.

Discography
A Best of CD was released by the EMI Gold imprint and another CD (The Mrs Mills Collection) appeared on the HMV Easy label. A list of her UK output (according to a vast, now lost Parlophone listing from the web) is as follows:

EMI/Parlophone Records — singles (all mono) with the Geoff Love Orchestra

EMI/Parlophone Records – EPs (all mono)

EMI/Parlophone Records – LPs (PMC: mono, PCS: stereo)

EMI/Music For Pleasure Records – LPs (all stereo)

Other recordings (all stereo) 

A number of additional albums, with titles such as Knees-Up Roaring 20s Party, Crazy Rhythm, Mairzy Doats and Dozy Doats, Just Mrs Gladys Mills, and Welcome To Mrs Mills' Honky Tonk Party, are either compilations of tracks from various EMI Parlophone albums and singles, or older albums reissued under new titles. The cover art on these albums, rather than the content, has been of interest to collectors.

References

1918 births
1978 deaths
People from Loughton
Parlophone artists
English women pianists
20th-century pianists
20th-century English musicians
20th-century English women musicians
EMI Records artists
Musicians from London
Capitol Records artists
People from Beckton
20th-century women pianists